Lennette Newell (born 1959) is an American photographer based in San Francisco, California, known for her animal, advertising, fashion, commercial and wildlife photography.

She has been selected as one of the 200 Best Ad Photographers by Lürzer's Archive of 2016/17, 2018/19, and 2019/20 and was named one of the 'Top 25 Photographers of 2020' by Creative Quarterly.

She is the recipient of numerous awards, including Communications Arts, American Photography 37, International Photography Awards, Lucie Awards, Hasselblad Masters Award, Black & White Spider Awards, PDN Annual, American Photography 26, Graphis, Hasselblad Masters Award, International Photography Awards, Photography Masters Cup, and Px3 Prix de la Photographie.

Early life and education 
Newell was born and grew up in Kimball, Nebraska, USA. She received her education from Brooks Institute of Photography in Santa Barbara, California. By the age of 6, she was an accomplished horseback rider, and won various pole and barrel racing competitions. Her father was a large animal veterinarian.

Work 
After completing her education, as a photographer, she pursued a career in commercial photography, specializing in photographing children and animals for advertising and corporate clients. She owns a studio Lennette Newell Photography, where she has photographed ads for brands like Milk-Bone, Blue Buffalo, Iams, Eukanuba, and Meow Mix.

Her works have received recognition from the American Photographic Artists National Awards, the 200 Best Ad Photographers, and the Lucie Awards. Some of her notable works include images of birds, such as Augur Buzzard (Buteo augur), Green Winged Macaw (Ara chloropterus), and Swainson's Toucan (Ramphastos swainsonii).

Lennette Newell co-authored a book named Welcome to the World, published by Kids Can Press in 2011, followed by publishing her another photography book named Ani-Human by Blurb in 2016.

Ani-Human series 
She is known for her Ani-Human series of portraits, where she combines orchestrates single captures and composite images of wild animals with humans in body paint together without a spatial barrier. Her themed photography Ani-Human integrates humans and animals. The series portrays the certainty that a tranquil co-inhabitance can exist, and therefore the possibility that it could propagate. She turns her human subjects into representations of animals such as Baboons, zebras, lions, cheetahs, monkeys using body paint and makeup. It had received numerous international awards in 2011. She was featured in an episode of Travel Channel China for her Ani-Human series in 2016.

Exhibitions 
Newell exhibits her work internationally, including Les Rencontres de la Photographie, Galerie Photo XII Paris, Leo Burnett in London, LA Art Show, Municipal Heritage Museum, Malaga, Novado Gallery, New Jersey and The Fair Art Show in New York, Les Rencontres de la Photographie, Dolores Art Volterra, Italy, Galerie Photo XII Paris, Galerie Bestregarts Frankfurt, the Centre de Cultura Contemporània de Barcelona, and others.

Books

Awards and recognition 
 Communication Arts Photography Annual, 2019, 2021
 American Photography 28,30,32,33,35,36,37, 2012, 2014 2016, 2017, 2019, 2020, 2021
 Julia Margaret Cameron Award, 2021
 Graphis Photography Annual Platinum Master Photographer, 2017, 2018, 2019, 2020
 200 Best Ad Photographers Lüerzers Archive, 2012, 2013, 2014, 2015, 2018, 2019, 2020, 2021
 International Photography Awards (IPA), 2005 through 2020 (15 consecutive years)
 American Photographic Artists National Awards, 2020
 American Photographic Artists Regional Awards, 2018, 2019, 2020
 International Color Awards, 2014, 2015, 2016, 2018, 2019, 2020
 Black & White Spider Awards, 2012, 2013, 2014, 2015, 2016, 2017, 2018, 2019, 2020
 Moscow Int'l Foto Award, 2014
 PDN Photography Annual Photography, 2014
 Pollux Award, 2014,2015, 2016, 2017
 Hasselblad Masters Award Finalist, 2012
 International Aperture Awards
 Prix de la Photographie, Paris, 2013, 2014, 2015, 2016
 Creative Quarterly, 2020
 3rd Jacob Riis Award, 2013
 Photography Masters Cup, 2012, 2013

Personal life 
She lives in Northern California near San Francisco, California.

See also 
 List of American women photographers

References

External links 
 
 Interrelating Composition (Interview) at Aesthetica
 Interview with Lennette Newell at At Edge
 Lennette Newell photographer at ArtDolores Laboratory at ZOOM magazine TV

20th-century American photographers
21st-century American photographers
Artists from California
Photographers from California
1959 births
Living people
20th-century American women photographers
21st-century American women photographers
People from California
Brooks Institute alumni